Norton is a civil parish in Kings County, New Brunswick, Canada.

For governance purposes it is divided between the town of Hampton, the village of Norton, and the local service district of the parish of Norton, all of which are members of Regional Service Commission 8 (RSC8).

Origin of name
Norton may have been named for Norton, Massachusetts, near Taunton, which was the original home of many of the first settlers to this area.

Notable is that the names of Kings County's pre-1800 parishes all occur in both New Jersey and North Carolina.

History
Norton was erected in 1795 from Sussex Parish and Kingston Parish.

In 1844 the boundary with Kingston was adjusted.

Writer Emily Elizabeth Shaw Beavan worked in the parish as a young teacher.

Boundaries
Norton Parish is bounded:

on the west and northwest by a line beginning at the northern bank of the Kennebecasis River, on the western line of a grant to Freedom Burdock, then running northwesterly along the grant line to its westernmost corner, about 150 metres southwest of the Ketchum Road, then northeasterly along the rear line of grants along the Kennebecasis River, including a dogleg away from the river, until it reaches the northernmost corner of a grant to John & Peter Cable, about 1.3 kilometres northeast of Route 845 and near the northern bank of Pickwauket Brook, then northwesterly to the Rogers Road at a point 65 chains (1.3 kilometres) inland of and parallel to the rear line of a tier of grants on the south side of Belleisle Bay, then running northeasterly along the parallel and its prolongation until it meets the Studholm Parish line at Route 124;
on the east by a line running north and south from the mouth of Halfway Brook on the Kennebecasis River, as far south as a point about 75 metres south of Byrnes Brook and 300 metres east-northeasterly of the Byrne Road;
on the south by a line running generally southwesterly following the old Westmorland Road past the Passekeag Road, then northwesterly along the prolongation of the southwestern line and then the line of a grant to John Fritch on the southern side of the Kennebecasis River, then southwesterly along the river to the starting point.

Communities
Communities at least partly within the parish; bold indicates an incorporated municipality; italics indicate a name no longer in official use

Bloomfield (Bloomfield Station)
Bloomfield Ridge
Central Norton
Dickie Mountain
Hampton
Lower Norton
Passekeag
Woodpecker Hall

Norton
Mercer Settlement
Midland
Peekaboo Corner
Southfield Road
Upper Midland

Bodies of water
Bodies of water at least partly in the parish:
Kennebecasis River
Moosehorn Creek
Passekeag Creek
McManus Lake

Demographics
Parish population total does not include Hampton and the village of Norton

Population
Population trend

Language
Mother tongue (2016)

Access Routes
Highways and numbered routes that run through the parish, including external routes that start or finish at the parish limits:

Highways
none

Principal Routes

Secondary Routes:

External Routes:
None

See also
List of parishes in New Brunswick

Notes

References

Parishes of Kings County, New Brunswick